The Gahrenberg is a hill in Hesse, Germany.

Hills of Hesse
Reinhardswald
North Hesse